The Sussex Archaeological Society, founded in 1846, is one of the oldest county-based archaeological societies in the UK. A registered self-funding charity whose charitable aims are to enable people to enjoy, learn about and have access to the heritage of Sussex. This is done by opening six historic sites in Sussex to visitors, providing research facilities in its library, running excavations, providing a finds identification service and offering a variety of walks, talks and conferences on the archaeology and history of Sussex. Its headquarters are at Bull House, High Street, Lewes, Sussex.  The current chief executive of the society is Andrew Edwards.

As well as the supervision of excavations within Sussex, the SAS publishes the Sussex Archaeological Collections and an annual report, and administers the Long Man of Wilmington. The six historic properties and museums open to the public are:

Fishbourne Roman Palace
Lewes Castle and Barbican House Museum
Anne of Cleves House, Lewes
Michelham Priory
Marlipins Museum, Shoreham-By-Sea
The Priest House, West Hoathly
In 2020 the society received a £250,000 grant from the National Lottery Heritage Fund to cover costs during the Covid-19 pandemic. The society received £323,800 from the British government's Culture Recovery Fund in 2021.

Investigations
In April 2006, the society started an archeological investigation into the Tide Mills area.  The investigation is expected by Newhaven Local & Maritime Museum to include not only the tide mill, but also to record the entire East Beach site: Mills, Railway Station, Nurses Home, Chailey Heritage Marine Hospital, Newhaven Seaplane Base and the later holiday homes and the Newhaven Marconi Radio Station of 1904.

Notable members
William Henry Blaauw (founder member)
George Slade Butler
Garth Christian (Council member)
Peter Drewett
Walter Godfrey
James Henry Hurdis (founder member)
Mark Antony Lower (founder member and employed as secretary)
Mark Aloysius Tierney secretary
John George Dodson, (member from 1852-)

Publications

The society has published an official journal, Sussex Archaeological Collections, annually since 1848 with a few gaps. It is sent to members and subscribers, and exchanged with other similar societies. The current editor is Jaime Kaminski.

References

External links
 

Archaeology of England
Archaeological
Archaeological
Archaeological organizations